Bobrinski's jerboa (Allactodipus bobrinskii) is a species of rodent in the family Dipodidae. It is monotypic within the genus Allactodipus.
It is found in Turkmenistan and Uzbekistan.

References

Mammals described in 1937
Dipodidae
Mammals of Central Asia
Taxonomy articles created by Polbot